Emre Köprülü (born 26 May 1981) is a Turkish politician from the Republican People's Party (CHP), who has served as a Member of Parliament for Tekirdağ since 12 June 2011.

Early life and career 
Emre Köprülü was born in Çorlu, Tekirdağ Province on 26 May 1981 to Cengiz Köprülü and his wife Hamiyet. He graduated from the Law Faculty of Marmara University. Köprülü worked as a freelance lawyer in Çorlu, before being elected as a CHP Member of Parliament for Tekirdağ during the 2011 general election. He is married to Elçin Köprülü.

Political career

Member of parliament 
He joined the Republican People's Party (CHP). Köprülü was elected as a CHP Member of Parliament for Tekirdağ in the 2011 general election. He was re-elected in June 2015 and November 2015.

References 

Contemporary Republican People's Party (Turkey) politicians
Members of the 24th Parliament of Turkey
Members of the 25th Parliament of Turkey
Members of the 26th Parliament of Turkey
1981 births
Living people